The Alan Higgs Centre, opened in September 2004, is a leisure centre situated in about  grounds near to the River Sowe, on Allard Way in the southeast of Coventry, England. It was designed by RHWL architects, and built by Galliford Try plc at a cost of about £8 million to their client and the current owner, the Alan Higgs Centre Trust. The funds were provided by the Alan Edward Higgs Charity.

In February 2020, the centre received some serious investment from Coventry City Council and Sport England.£13.5m was spent renovating the gym, sauna, steam rooms, jacuzzi, building a new indoor 50m pool and relocating the indoor 3G pitch. The 50m pools floor can be raised to deck level and dropped to 2 metres while also being able to be split in half with an immersible boom.

The renovated gym area boasts 100 fitness stations, functional training area and indoor group cycling room that overlooks the 50m pool.

History

The judo and volleyball competitions of the 2007 UK School Games were held in The Alan Higgs Centre, being one of the venues for the games which were held in the Coventry from 23 to 26 August 2007. In August 2013, non-league football team Coventry United announced that The Alan Higgs Centre would be their new home ground. On 12 February 2019, a new dome opened. In February 2020 a new Olympic-sized swimming pool at the Alan Higgs Centre opened, replacing the one at the defunct Coventry Sports & Leisure Centre. The new pool facilities include a hot tub, a sauna, and seating for 500 people.

Facilities
The Coventry City Football Club's Academy is based at The Alan Higgs Centre. There are four outdoor grass football pitches, a synthetic indoor pitch, and a synthetic floodlit outdoor pitch. It is also a venue for county netball games, and there is a skateboard area.

References

Sports venues in Coventry
Sports venues completed in 2004